Margaret McKellar (23 October 1861 – 24 August 1941) was a Scottish-born Canadian medical missionary. She was the first medical missionary at Neemuch, India, where she founded a hospital. She was also the founder of Knox Church Missionary Society in Calgary. She was decorated by King George V for her work in India.

Early years and education
Margaret McKellar was born on the Isle of Mull, Scotland, 23 October 1861. She was the daughter Captain Peter McKellar of Port Elgin, Ontario. She came to Canada in early childhood.

McKellar was educated in public schools, and Ingersoll High School. She received her M.D. from Queen's University in 1890. She furthered her education at Woman's Medical College (now Women's College Hospital), and with post-graduate studies in Edinburgh and London.

Career
McKellar became a member of the College of Physicians and Surgeons of Ontario, in 1890, and in that year, went to Central India as a medical missionary of the Presbyterian Church in Canada, locating as the first medical missionary at Neemuch, where she founded a hospital which was of great benefit to that region. She took an active part in the famine relief work at that place.

McKellar was a frequent contributor to missionary and secular press on missionary and other Indian topics. On a home visit in 1898, she addressed the General Assembly of the Presbyterian Church, at Montreal. She was the author of A Trip Into Kashmir, 1907.

She retired in 1930.

Selected works
 A Trip Into Kashmir, 1907

References

Attribution
 

1861 births
19th-century Scottish medical doctors
19th-century Canadian physicians
20th-century Canadian physicians
19th-century Canadian writers
19th-century Canadian women writers
20th-century Canadian writers
20th-century Canadian women writers
20th-century women physicians
19th-century women physicians
People from the Isle of Mull
Canadian Presbyterian missionaries
Presbyterian missionaries in India
People from Neemuch
Year of death unknown
Scottish women medical doctors
Canadian women physicians